Garcinia epunctata is a tall tropical rainforest tree in the family Clusiaceae. The tree is known for growing on inselbergs found in moist tropical forests of West Africa, including Upper Guinean forests, Lower Guinean forests, and Congolian forests south through Angola, both coastal and inland forests.

References

epunctata
Flora of Ghana
Trees of Africa
Vulnerable plants
Taxonomy articles created by Polbot